Meelis Loit (born 15 April 1971) is an Estonian fencer. He competed in the individual and team épée events at the 1996 and 2000 Summer Olympics, but received no medals.

Loit's bout with Kovacs in the 2001 Team World Epee Championship helped instigate rules against passivity, because Loit refused to engage with his opponent.

References

External links
 

1971 births
Living people
Estonian male épée fencers
Olympic fencers of Estonia
Fencers at the 1996 Summer Olympics
Fencers at the 2000 Summer Olympics
Sportspeople from Tallinn
20th-century Estonian people
21st-century Estonian people